Manningham United Blues Football Club is an Australian soccer club from Templestowe, a suburb of Melbourne, Victoria. The club was formed in 1965 by local Italian Australians and was formerly known as Fawkner Blues. 

In 2010, Fawkner SC split from the club. Manningham United plays their senior games at Pettys Reserve.

History 
In 1999, the club, originally known as Manningham Juniors Soccer Club, had just three junior teams, with a committee led by Paul Martinello and Tari Mallia.

Fawkner-Whittlesea Blues 
In 2004 Fawkner Blues merged with Whittlesea Stallions to form Fawkner-Whittlesea Blues. Their home games were played at Whittlesea's home stadium Epping Stadium. The merge only lasted until 2006. The club played in the 2005 and 2006 Victorian Premier League. In 2005 they finished fourth but only six points from first. The following year, the final year before Fawkner-Whittlesea dissolved, it finished 10th. At the end of 2006, Fawkner opted to go back to being a stand-alone club and Whittlesea forming a partnership with Bulleen Lions to form the Whittlesea Zebras, who have been known as Moreland Zebras FC since 2011.

In 2013, Manningham were playing in the Victorian State League 5 and had finished 5th. Fawkner on the other hand playing in State League 1 would finish dead last, below Eastern Lions by 6 points. The season before the merger, Manningham had just escaped the bottom of the ladder finishing above Brandon Park who only managed one win in the entire season. Manningham ended the season on 19 points with 6 wins and 1 draw. In the 2014 season Fawkner finished 3rd behind Preston Lions and Moreland City.

Manningham United Blues 
On 27 November 2014 it was announced that Manningham United, a then Victorian State League 4 team would merge with Fawkner Blues, a State League 1 team, and Manningham United Blues Football Club was born. In 2014 they fielded 30 junior teams and have grown to be the biggest community club in Manningham. They moved from CB Smith Reserve which Fawkner SC now plays at to play at Mannigham's ground Timberidge or alternatively Wilson Road Reserve. In its inaugural season Manningham finished a disappointing 10th. In 2016, it finished in fifth.

In the first season of the merger, Manningham United Blues would finish 10th.

Manningham's seniors had a relatively slow start to the season with only two wins in the first five matches. however form hit when they won six matches in a row from round 7–12 and were only stopped by eventual winners Mornington SC. It looked at that point even though there was a loss to Mornington there was still a good chance of a high place finish or even the title. However, with one win in the last five matches including a 3–3 draw to bottom side Frankston Pines FC a fifth-place finish would ultimately be disappointing for Manningham. 

In 2018, Manningham achieved promotion from State League 1 to the National Premier Leagues Victoria 2 with a league championship. Dean Lorenzi finished as the club's and league's top goalscorer with 21 goals.

National Premier Leagues Victoria 
Manningham United reached an agreement with the Veneto Club in Bulleen, Victoria to play its senior home games for the 2019 season.

Club name and logo

Logo 
Fawkner's original logo has not been touched except for their brief merge with Whittlesea Stallions in 2004 which would eventually end in 2006. After Fawkner-Whittlesea Blues dissolved Fawkner changed back to their original logo. When they would eventually merge with Manningham it would stay relatively the same, however that cannot be said for Manningham.

Manningham started off in 1999 with a soccer ball as the foundation of their logo with blue pentagons and blue and white stripes on it. In 2011 a name change and a new logo as well the ball still featured heavily but

instead of blue and white it would be blue and black to match their new colours. This new logo would only last three years because in 2014 Manningham and Fawkner would merge and the logo stayed relatively the same

and it so happened that a soccer ball once again featured heavily on the logo.

Name 
The club that is now Manningham United Blues originally was founded in 1965 under the name Fawkner however in 1994 they changed their club name to Fawkner Blues, with a brief change to Fawkner-Whittlesea Blues after a merge with Whittlesea in 2004 which ended in 2006.

merge with Manningham United in 2014 as Manningham adopted the blues to become Manningham United Blues. Manningham have also had several name changes. Beginning as Manningham Junior Soccer Club in 1999

the club swapped out the soccer for a more traditional football. The name and logo lasted only three years after a merge with Fawkner in 2014 and they adopted part of their name and majority of their badge.

Kit provider and sponsor

FFA/Australia Cup Record

Overall

Matches

Records 
Biggest Win

Manningham United 13–0 Tatura SC

BIggest Defeat

North Geelong Warriors FC 6–1 Manningham United FC

Manningham United FC 0–5 Oakleigh Cannons FC

Best Result

Sixth Round Preliminary, 2014

Top Goalscorer

Billy Romas: (4)

Most Appearances

David Lorenzi (9)

Notes
Manninham's score is always in bold
P: Preliminary Round

Dockerty Cup Record 
From 2014 onwards, the Dockerty Cup is also a qualifying completion for the FFA Cup.

Overall

Matches

Records 
Biggest Win

Karingal United 0–6 Fawkner (14 October 1984)

Fawkner 7–1 Springvale United (27 February 1993)

St Albans 0–6 Fawkner Blues (31 August 2004)

Biggest Defeat

Brunswick Juventus 7–0 Fawkner (17 October 1987)

Notes

Manninham's score is always in bold

AFL1: Affiliated Leagues Round One

PR: Provisional League Preliminary Round

PL2: Provisional League Second Round

P1: First Preliminary Round

P2: Second Preliminary Round

P3: Third Preliminary Round

R: Round

QF: Quarter Final

SF: Semi Final

F: Final

AET: After Extra Time

†: Match Went to Penalties

Ref:

State knockout cup 
The State knockout cup also known as the previously known as the "Team App Cup" now known as the "Nike F.C. Cup" is an annual women's cup which was introduced in 2012 under the name Women's State Knockout Cup, Manningham first competed in 2017 entering in the qualifying round.

Overall

Matches 

Notes

Manninham's score is always in bold

QR: Qualifying Round

Competition timeline

Records

Individual Records 
Most Appearances- (485)  Tony Schipano (1980–1983, 1985–1992, 1994–2003)

Top Goalscorer-  (45)  Bruno Cozzella (1983–1986, 1988)

Team Records 
Highest League Position: 1st Victorian Premier League (2002)

Lowest League Position:  7th Victorian Metropolitan League South-East (2009)

Most Wins In A Single Season: 22, (1982)

Most Draws In A Single Season: 13, (1994)

Most Losses In A Single Season: 17, (1989 and 2008)

Most Points In A Single Season: 46, (1982, and 1999)

Most Goals Scored In A Single Season: 81, (1978)

Most Goals Conceded In A Single Season: 59, (2008)

Biggest League Win: Fawkner 11–0 South Dandenong, Victorian Provisional League, 10 September 1977

Biggest League Defeat: Fawkner Blues 0–6 Heidelberg United, Victorian Premier League, 13 July 2008

Highest Scoring League Game:  Fawkner 11–0 South Dandenong, Victorian Provisional, League 10 September 1977

Manningham 4–7 Albert Park, Victorian Metropolitan League Central, 9 April 2011

Manningham 4–7 Kingston City, NPL Victoria 2, 1 May 2021

Attendances 
Highest ever attendance: 6,500 vs Preston Lions at Bob Jane Stadium, Victorian Premier League Grand Final, 25 August 2002

Highest home attendance: 4,750 vs Preston Lions at Epping Stadium, Victorian Premier League 4 July 2005

Honours

League

Victorian Premier League (Victorian second tier) 
Minor Premiers(1) 2002
Runners Up(1) 1993

Victorian Metropolitan League Division 1 (Victorian third tier)
Champions(1) 1982
Victorian Metropolitan League Division 2/State League 1(Victorian fourth tier)
Champions(2) 1981, 2018
Runners Up(1) 2010
Victorian Metropolitan League Division 3/State League 2 North-West  (Victorian fifth tier)
Champions(1)2012
Runners Up(1) 1980
Provisional League/Victorian Metropolitan League Division 4 (Victorian sixth tier) 
Champions(1) 1978
Runners Up(3) 1973,1975,1977
Metropolitan League 5 South-East 
Champions(1) 2017

Cup

Dockerty Cup 
Winners(1) 1984
Runners Up(1) 2004

Individual honours 
FFV Best and Fairest
2011 Mens Metro Central – Steven Dimitriovski

VPL Player of the Year
1989 – George Campbell
1990 – Claude Lucchesi

Bill Fleming Medal
2002 – Henry Fa'arodo
2003 – Tony Schipano

VPL Goalkeeper of the Year
2007 – Steve Tilovski

VPL Coach of the Year
2002 – Josip Biskic

VPL Under 21 Player of the Year
2002 – Steven Panebianco

Wienstein Medal
1997 – Michael Ferrante

Jimmy Rooney Medal
1993 – Adrian Pender

Current squad

Senior squad

Notable players 

 Adrian Zahra (Youth Career)
 Andreas Govas (Youth Career)
 Patrick Kisnorbo (Youth Career)
 Doug Brown (1987–1988)
 Scott Fraser (1988)
 George Campbell (1989)
 Carlos Retre (1991–1997)
 Dean Anastasiadis (1991–1992)
 Manny Anezakis (1992–1994)
 Chris Jackson (1993–1994)
 Brian Bothwell (1993, 1994 & 1996)
 Ante Juric (1994)
 Jude Kattan (1994)
 Ransford Banini (1995)
 Marcus Stergiopoulos (1996, 2011)
 Jeff Olver (1997)
 Josip Biskic (1998–2001)
 Henry Fa'arodo (2002,2004)
 Chimaobi Nwaogazi (2003)
 Massimo Murdocca (2004–2005)
 Andrew Marth (2004)
 Michael Ferrante (2004)
 John Markovski (2004–2006)
 Saša Ognenovski (2005)
 Vince Lia (2005)
 Carl Recchia (2006–2007)
 Ben Sigmund (2006)
 Dakota Lucas (2015)
 Vojtěch Engelmann (2016)
 Siddharth Singh (2016–2017)
 Filippo Gattari (2019)
 Yanni Barberoglou (2019)
 Nicolas Chalmet (2022-)
 Kojo Brown (2022-)

Notable managers 
 Branko Čulina (1994)
 Michael Micevski (1994)
 Kenny Murphy (1997–2000)
 Josip Biskić (2002–2003)
 Eddie Krncevic (2003)
 John Markovski (2004–2006)

See also 
 Fawkner-Whittlesea Blues

References

External links 
Official Site
OzFootball Page
Football Federation Victoria Official website

Victorian Premier League teams
Association football clubs established in 1965
Soccer clubs in Melbourne
Victorian State League teams
1965 establishments in Australia
Italian-Australian culture in Melbourne
Italian-Australian backed sports clubs of Victoria
Sport in the City of Manningham